Anastasios Londos (Greek: Ἀναστάσιος Λόντος, "Anastásios Lóndos"; 1791–1856) was a Greek politician, mayor of Aigio and senator of the Kingdom of Greece.

Early life 
He was born in Aigio in 1791 and was the offspring of a powerful family of nobles. He was sent to Pisa to study medicine but with the outbreak of the revolution of 1821 he returned to Greece, as a result of which he interrupted his studies.

Political career 
He was elected representative of the province of Vostitsa in the Astros National Assembly in 1823 and took part in totally three of the Greek National Assemblies (1823, 1826 and 1843). During the period of the government of Kapodistrias he served as extraordinary commissioner of the Northern Sporades but eventually joined the anti-government opposition forces. In 1835 he was appointed mayor of Aigio, he held this position until 1837. In 1850 he was elected member of parliament for Aigialeia and in 1853 he was elected senator. In 1854–1855 he served as Minister of Justice in the government of Mavrokordatos, while in 1855–1856 he took over the Ministry of Foreign Affairs in the government of Dimitrios Voulgaris.

He died in 1856 while serving as a senator of Greece.

Family 
He was the brother of Andreas Londos, Lucas Londos and Maria Messinézi. His father Sotirakis Londos was a distinguished Greek politician.

References

Sources
 

1791 births
1856 deaths
People from Aigio
Members of the Greek Senate
Ministers of the Interior of Greece
Mayors of places in Greece